Most of Frédéric Chopin's polonaises were written for solo piano.  He wrote his first polonaise in 1817, when he was 7; his last was the Polonaise-Fantaisie of 1846, three years before his death.  Among the best known polonaises are the "Military" Polonaise in A, Op. 40, No. 1, and the "Heroic" Polonaise in A, Op. 53.

There is also the Andante spianato et grande polonaise brillante in E, Op. 22, for piano and orchestra, which also exists in a solo piano version; and the Introduction and Polonaise brillante in C major, Op. 3, for cello and piano.

Polonaises for solo piano
Chopin wrote at least 23 polonaises for piano solo.  Of these:
 7, including the Polonaise-Fantaisie, were published in his lifetime
 3 were published posthumously with opus numbers
 6 were published posthumously without opus numbers
 at least 7 are lost.

List of polonaises by Chopin

These are for solo piano unless otherwise indicated.

See also
 List of compositions by Frédéric Chopin by genre
 List of compositions by Frédéric Chopin by opus number

References